The Royal Hibernian Military School was founded in Dublin, Ireland in 1769, to educate orphaned children of members of the British armed forces in Ireland.

In 1922 the Royal Hibernian Military School moved to Shorncliffe, in Folkestone, Kent, and in 1924 it was merged with the Duke of York's Royal Military School which, by then, was in its current location atop 'Lone Tree Hill' above Dover Castle.

General
The foundation of the School came about in 1769 when King George III granted a Charter of Incorporation on 15 July, the School Governors holding their inaugural meeting on 6 November in Dublin Castle.

The buildings housing the school were erected in 1771 in the Phoenix Park, overlooking the village of Chapelizod in the Liffey valley (in full view of the Wicklow mountains). The chapel was designed by Thomas Cooley, while thirty years later Francis Johnston designed the extensions to the buildings. It first took in 90 boys and 50 girls as pupils (in the charge of an Inspector and Inspectress, assisted by the Chaplain and an assistant mistress) in March 1770.  The site originally occupied  but by 1922 its boundary walls enclosed thirty three acres.

By 1808 the system and organisation of the school followed closely that of its sister school, the Duke of York's Royal Military School (then at Chelsea, London, England). By 1816, when Thomas Le Fanu (father of Sheridan Le Fanu) took over as chaplain, there were 600 children at the school.

In 1853 the school's first "stand of colours" were presented by the then Prince of Wales and, in the same year, the girls at the school left to join their own separate establishment, the Drummond School, which was founded for them at Chapelizod.

The school acted as a feeder to the British Army, where In the mid-19th century, children as young as 12 could enlist in the Army but generally enlistment began at 14. By the 1900s 50 per cent of pupils were going straight into the army. By this stage the school was not only an orphanage; for instance, the Army Non-Commissioned Officer father of Liam Mellows entered him there to get a good basic military training which he hoped would lead to an army career, instead it was used during the Easter Rising and the Irish War of Independence, both in fighting and in training the flying columns in guerrilla warfare.

Many of the school's pupils carried acts of gallantry in the wars that the British Army was involved in. One such individual was Frederick Jeremiah Edwards who was awarded the Victoria Cross for extraordinary bravery in the First World War.

Relocation and merger
In 1922 the Royal Hibernian Military School moved to Shorncliffe, in Folkestone, Kent, and in 1924 it was merged with the Duke of York's Royal Military School which by then was in its current location atop 'Lone Tree Hill' above Dover Castle.

A stained glass window depicting a saluting boy soldier is sited above the 'minstrel gallery' type balcony of the Duke of York's School Chapel in Dover, and commemorates the merging of the schools.

Dublin campus
The buildings of the Dublin campus are now part of St Mary's Hospital, Phoenix Park. A war memorial remains.

Bohemian F.C.
Members of the school were instrumental in forming Bohemian F.C. in 1890.

Commandants
List of Commandants
Lieutenant Colonel Hugh Colville 17 January 1809
Colonel George Thomas Colomb up to 1858 (promoted major general on 26 October 1858)
Brevet Lieutenant Colonel Henry Buckley Jenner Wynyard, late 89th Foot 1 November 1878 
Lieutenant Colonel Lynch Stapleton Cotton, late 63rd Foot 1 May 1879
Colonel Francis Charles Hill, late The Essex Regiment 31 May 1882
Colonel C de N O Stockwell 31 May 1889
Colonel Henry Hall - 31 August 1902
Lieutenant-Colonel Rowley Wynyard, Royal Artillery 1 September 1902

References

Bibliography
 
 

Defunct schools in Kent
Military schools
Relocated schools
Educational organisations based in Ireland
Military education and training in the United Kingdom
1769 establishments in Ireland
Educational institutions established in 1769
Educational institutions disestablished in 1924
1924 disestablishments in England
Schools in County Dublin
Phoenix Park